The O'Berry Neuro-Medical Center is a public hospital in Goldsboro, North Carolina owned by the North Carolina Department of Health and Human Services.  Its original goal was to help the intellectually disabled achieve independence by teaching them self-help skills and productive vocations.  It has recently expanded its focus to include those who are either elderly or medically fragile along with having an intellectual disability.

The facility now serves a 23-county South Central Region and handles 430 clients.  It is one of three Neuro-Medical Treatment Centers in North Carolina, the others being Longleaf (formerly Wilson) and Black Mountain.  O'Berry's director since 2011 has been Dr. Michael Bunch.

History 
The facility traces its origins to a commission created in 1943 by Governor Joseph Broughton to study the "condition, care, treatment and training" of black mentally retarded citizens at Goldsboro State Hospital (now Cherry Hospital).  The facility opened in November 1957 with 150 black mentally retarded clients.  It desegregated in 1966.

Notes

Sources 
Official webpage at North Carolina Division of Mental Health

Hospital buildings completed in 1957
Hospitals in North Carolina
Goldsboro, North Carolina
Buildings and structures in Wayne County, North Carolina